German submarine U-877 was a Type IXC/40 U-boat of Nazi Germany's Kriegsmarine during the Second World War. The ship was ordered on 2 April 1942, laid down on 22 May 1943, and launched on 10 December 1943. She was commissioned into the Kriegsmarine under the command of Kapitänleutnant Eberhard Findeisen on 24 March 1944. Initially assigned to the 4th U-boat Flotilla, she was transferred to the 33rd U-boat Flotilla on 1 December 1944.

Design
German Type IXC/40 submarines were slightly larger than the original Type IXCs. U-877 had a displacement of  when at the surface and  while submerged. She had two shafts and two  propellers.

U-877 was fitted with six  torpedo tubes (four fitted at the bow and two at the stern), 22 torpedoes, one  SK C/32 naval gun, 180 rounds, and a  Flak M42 as well as two twin  C/30 anti-aircraft guns. The boat had a complement of forty-eight.

Service history
She carried out a single war patrol, departing Horten Naval Base on 25 November 1944. Two days later she was attacked by Bristol Beaufighters of No. 489 Squadron, which launched two depth charges at her. She crash dived, escaping the attackers, but losing her radar antenna.

U-877 was attacked on 27 December 1944 in the North Atlantic, north-west of the Azores, by the Royal Canadian Navy's  . She was badly damaged by St. Thomass squid mortar and sank at position , after her crew had abandoned ship. All 56 were picked up by St. Thomas.

The end of the submarine and the friendship that develops between both captains is described in the book "Ne Tirez Pas" (Don't shoot) written by Jean-Louis Morgan and Linda Sinclair published by Edition l'Archipel .

References

Bibliography

External links

German Type IX submarines
U-boats commissioned in 1944
World War II submarines of Germany
U-boats sunk in 1944
U-boats sunk by Canadian warships
World War II shipwrecks in the Atlantic Ocean
1943 ships
Ships built in Bremen (state)
Maritime incidents in December 1944